The Metro Manila Film Festival Award for Best Make-up Artist is an award presented annually by the Metropolitan Manila Development Authority (MMDA). It was first awarded at the 16th Metro Manila Film Festival ceremony, held in 1990; Denni Tan, Dominique Nazareth and Andrea Manahan won the award for their make-up in Shake, Rattle & Roll II and it is given to make-up artists and hair-stylists who demonstrate skills in cosmetics in a motion picture. Currently, nominees and winners are determined by Executive Committees, headed by the Metropolitan Manila Development Authority Chairman and key members of the film industry.

Winners and nominees

1990s

2000s

2010s

References

External links
IMDB: Metro Manila Film Festival
Official website of the Metro Manila Film Festival

Make-up Artist
Film awards for makeup and hairstyling